Hoyos de Miguel Muñoz is a municipality located in the province of Ávila, Castile and León, Spain. According to the 2006 census (INE), the municipality has a population of 46 inhabitants.

At 1,534 metres elevation, Hoyos de Miguel Muñoz is the highest peak in the province of Ávila and the 6th highest in Spain.

References

Municipalities in the Province of Ávila